Donald Ray Bryant (July 13, 1941 – January 22, 2015) was an American catcher and coach in Major League Baseball. He was nicknamed "Bear" by baseball teammates in homage to University of Alabama football coach Paul "Bear" Bryant. Born in Jasper, Florida, he attended high school at the Paxon School for Advanced Studies in Jacksonville.

Career
Bryant's 14-year professional playing career, which included 892 games played in the minor leagues and 59 games at the MLB level, began in the Detroit Tigers' organization in 1960. He spent six seasons there until late 1965, when he was purchased by the Chicago Cubs. He began his MLB career with the Cubs in 1966, then later played for the 1969–70 Houston Astros. In the Majors, Bryant batted .220 with 24 hits, one home run and 13 runs batted in, and caught Don Wilson's second career no-hitter on May 1, 1969, against the Cincinnati Reds. Bryant's only big-league home run, a two-run blast, came two days later off Bobby Bolin of the San Francisco Giants, the winning blow in an eventual 4–3 Houston victory.

Bryant was acquired by the Boston Red Sox in December 1970 and became a playing coach for their Triple-A affiliate, the Pawtucket Red Sox, in 1973. The following year, Pawtucket manager Darrell Johnson was promoted to Boston as field boss, and brought Bryant with him as bullpen coach. Bryant coached under Johnson in Boston (1974–76) — serving on the 1975 American League championship team — and with the Seattle Mariners (1977–80) before leaving the game.

References

External links
, or Retrosheet
Venezuelan Professional Baseball League
Obituary

 
 

1941 births
2015 deaths
Arizona Instructional League Cubs players
Baseball coaches from Florida
Baseball players from Florida
Boston Red Sox coaches
Chicago Cubs players
Columbus Astros players
Decatur Commodores players
Houston Astros players
Industriales de Valencia players
Jamestown Tigers players
Knoxville Smokies players
Llaneros de Acarigua players
Louisville Colonels (minor league) players
Major League Baseball catchers
Major League Baseball bullpen coaches
Montgomery Rebels players
Oklahoma City 89ers players
Pawtucket Red Sox players
People from Jasper, Florida
Phoenix Giants players
Salt Lake City Bees players
Seattle Mariners coaches
Syracuse Chiefs players
Tacoma Cubs players